The Night Comes for Us is a 2018 Indonesian action thriller film written and directed by Timo Tjahjanto. It was originally conceived as a screenplay and then adapted into a graphic novel, before finally being released as a film. In December 2014, Tjahjanto confirmed he was working with Indonesian artist hub Glitch Network to adapt his original screenplay into comic form. The film stars Iko Uwais, Joe Taslim, Julie Estelle, Sunny Pang, Zack Lee, and Shareefa Daanish.

The film is based on a top organized crime enforcer (Taslim) who decides to turn his back on his former life as a killer to rescue a young girl. The crime syndicate sends in a rising gang prospect (Uwais) and legions of thugs to eliminate the enforcer and the young girl. The film was released to positive reviews, with critics praising the action and Uwais, Estelle, and Taslim's performances, although the excessive violence was criticized.

The film premiered at Fantastic Fest on 22 September 2018. Four days later, it was announced that Netflix had acquired the distribution rights, and the film was released worldwide on 19 October 2018 to good ratings.

Plot
Ito is one of six elite enforcers for the South East Asian Triad, known as the Six Seas (Indonesian: enam laut). After massacring a village because a few villagers had stolen Triad drugs, Ito discovers a survivor, a young girl named Reina. Ito, feeling remorseful and sympathetic, turns on the Triad soldiers present and kills them all. He later returns to his childhood home of Jakarta and hides Reina in his ex-girlfriend Shinta's apartment. Shinta treats his wounds and calls in Fatih, who used to be in a gang with Ito. Fatih relocates them to his own apartment and brings in his cousin Wisnu, and the last member of the old gang, Bobby, a drug addict who has lost his leg. He also arranges for Ito and Reina to get new passports and escape the country.

Arian, a former member of the old gang, has moved to Macau where he is running a club for the Triad. He brutally slaughters random crooks when they beat up one of his waitresses and take her hostage at the club. A member of the Six Seas, Chien Wu, calls him in to help kill Ito and take his place as a new member of the Six Seas enforcers. Enticed at the idea, Arian accepts the offer.

Ito goes to meet an old acquaintance, Yohan, in order to get the money he left behind in Jakarta. Yohan is revealed to also be connected with the Triad, and a resulting fight ensues. Ito kills Yohan's men, but not before Yohan makes a phone call that brings in corrupt cops. They gun down Yohan and take Ito away.

Bobby discovers Yohan's thugs infiltrating Fatih's building. He gets Shinta to safety before killing some thugs on an elevator and returns to help Wisnu and Fatih fight. They are initially successful despite being outnumbered and heavily injured, but Triad enforcers Elena and Alma arrive. They kill the last of Yohan's men and Wisnu. Bobby sacrifices his life in order to help Fatih and Reina escape by distracting Elena, who kills Bobby with a Kukri. Arian intervenes before Alma can kill a heavily injured Fatih, knocking her unconscious. Fatih deduces that Arian told Yohan and the Triad where he lived due to Arian being one of the only members to know where Fatih was located. He refuses further help from Arian and barely shoots at him, but is unable to bring himself to kill him. More Triad attempt to ambush Fatih and Reina in the garage. Fatih gets Reina to hide before sacrificing his life by distracting the triad members. The ambushers are all killed by a mysterious woman nicknamed The Operator.

Ito frees himself and returns to Fatih's, where he discovers his former colleagues dead. Reina finds him and after they relocate to Shinta's apartment, they bond. The Operator then arrives and attempts to kill Ito. When she wins, she is persuaded by Reina to talk to him instead of killing him. She states her intentions to eliminate the Six Seas members, Ito included, and tells him of Arian's reappearance in Jakarta. Ito explains that he feels remorse for killing innocent people, and tells her to kill him, but she disappears.

Chien Wu again meets with Arian. Initially angry at Arian for stopping Alma from killing Fatih, Chien Wu gives Arian one last chance to kill Ito, and offers him Ito's place in the Six Seas should he kill him. When Arian questions why Chien Wu wants to kill Ito, Chien Wu explains that his main goal is to cause chaos within Jakarta. In a flashback, it is revealed that Ito and Arian, working out of the warehouse the Triad is currently using, entered the Triad together in order to move up in the world.

The Operator returns to Ito's apartment in an attempt to get Reina to a safe location, while Ito travels to the warehouse and slaughters all the Triad henchmen there. As more henchmen arrive at Ito's apartment to kill him, The Operator kills them all in quick fashion. When Elena and Alma also arrive, The Operator engages in a brutal fight with them but manages to kill both Elena and Alma.

Arian takes out a sniper who was about to kill Ito. The two talk about their former lives, and Arian's intention to join the Six Seas. In a long and brutal fight, both are severely wounded. Ito finally gains the upper hand but instead of killing Arian, he leaves. Chien Wu arrives and insults Arian for his failure to kill Ito a second time. Arian tries to shoot him but finds that he is out of bullets. Chien Wu has Arian executed with the help of six hitmen led by Arian's assistant, presumably hinting that the assistant is the new Six Seas member in Ito's place.

The Operator safely guides Reina to Ito and leaves. Ito puts Reina on a departing ship but does not board himself. After they mutually wave goodbye for the last time, Ito, badly wounded, gets in his car before spotting Chien Wu and more Triad members henchmen in front of him. Ito, grinning savagely, drives his car toward them as they open fire. His fate and the Triads are left unknown.

Cast

 Joe Taslim as Ito, a former member of the Six Seas Triad who is on the run after saving a young girl.
 Iko Uwais	as Arian, a former gang member and friend of Ito who attempts to kill him for his own ambitions of power.
 Asha Kenyeri Bermudez as Reina, a young girl, and survivor of the massacre on her village committed by Ito and other Triad members.
 Sunny Pang as Chien Wu, a current Six Seas member who wants to kill Ito and spread chaos throughout the world.
 Julie Estelle as The Operator, a mysterious woman who is tasked to kill Ito and the rest of the Six Seas members for unknown reasons.
 Salvita Decorte as Shinta, Ito's former girlfriend.
 Abimana Aryasatya as Fatih, Ito's friend, and former gang member alongside Arian.
 Zack Lee as White Boy Bobby Bule, a current drug addict and another former gang member alongside Ito, Fatih, and Arian. 
  as Wisnu, a former member of Ito's gang.
 Dian Sastrowardoyo as Alma, an enforcer for the Triad, and Chien Wu, who uses a ball attached to a metallic string for weapons.
 Hannah Al Rashid as Elena, another enforcer for the Triad, Chien Wu, and the lover of Alma who uses a Kukri as a weapon.
  as the Triad's sniper
  as Aliong
 Morgan Oey as Arian's assistant
  as the Night Handler
  as Yohan, a former friend of Ito who currently works for the Triad.

Production
In September 2014, pre-production on the film was halted and three months later Tjahjanto confirmed he was adapting the script into a graphic novel.

Release
RADiUS-TWC has acquired North American distribution rights in 2014 prior to the beginning of production, but allegations against the label's owner Harvey Weinstein, and its parent company The Weinstein Company about to liquidate its entire assets to Lantern Entertainment, they sold the entire rights to Netflix.

The trailer was released on 10 October 2018. The film was released on 19 October 2018.

Critical response
The website's consensus reads, "A bloody thrill ride designed to test the limits of more squeamish viewers, The Night Comes for Us wields a stylishly violent, action-packed punch." Metacritic, which uses a weighted average, assigned a score of 69 out of 100 based on reviews from 6 critics, indicating "generally favorable reviews."

In a positive review, Barry Hertz of The Globe and Mail wrote, "Unless you are on the programming committee for the most literally bloody-minded of film festivals, you have never experienced as ludicrously violent and gore-soaked a film as The Night Comes for Us." Richard Kuipers of Variety wrote: "This cartoonish cavalcade of carnage potently reunites The Raid stars Joe Taslim and Iko Uwais as former friends on a corpse-strewn collision course."

Dan Jackson of Thrillist was more critical of the film. He wrote: "Instead of feeling like the action organically emerges from the situational demands of the narrative, it often feels like the story was reverse engineered to center around the often stunning physical feats."

In October 2018, American comic book artist Robert Liefeld, who co-created the popular Marvel superhero character Deadpool, praised Tjahjanto's work on the film via his Twitter account. In an enthusiastic reaction, Liefeld suggested that Tjahjanto should be given "all the money for Deadpool 3", referring to the upcoming installment of the Deadpool film series. He went on to acknowledge the influence of Indonesian cinema on the action genre while also suggesting Tjahjanto to direct a standalone Cable film, referring to another Marvel superhero character that was portrayed by Josh Brolin in the 2018 film Deadpool 2.

Sequels
Tjahjanto has publicly confirmed that he has developed a story for a sequel, likely to focus on Julie Estelle's character The Operator. In 2022, leading up to the release of his second Netflix collaboration, The Big 4, Tjahjanto said that a sequel "is still not official", but that he is hopeful.

References

External links
 
 
 
 

2018 action thriller films
Indonesian-language Netflix original films
2010s Indonesian-language films
2010s Mandarin-language films
2010s English-language films
English-language Indonesian films
Indonesian action thriller films
Crime graphic novels
2018 martial arts films
Silat films
Neo-noir
Indonesian martial arts films
2018 multilingual films
Indonesian multilingual films
Films set in Macau
Triad films
2010s Hong Kong films